Nebria sahlbergi is a species of brown coloured ground beetle in the Nebriinae subfamily that can be found in Aleutian Islands, Canada, and in the southern part of the United States.

References

sahlbergi
Beetles described in 1828
Beetles of North America